Domingo (Sunday) is the eighth studio album released by Brazilian rock band Titãs. The album became a gold record in Brazil. It is the second Titãs album produced by Jack Endino.

Context and production 
Domingo came after a period of solo projects by most of the band's members. Vocalists Branco Mello and Sérgio Britto (the latter also being the keyboardist) had released Con el Mundo a Mis Pies under their project Kleiderman; the also vocalists Paulo Miklos and Nando Reis (the latter also being the bassist) had experienced their solo debuts (Paulo Miklos and 12 de Janeiro, respectively) and guitarist Tony Bellotto had published his first book, Bellini e a Esfinge.

The solo releases were of different styles and exposed the fact that Titãs was formed by different minds and ideas. The band itself admits the albums always ended up leaving a member disappointed. Bellotto didn't felt represented by the electronic elements of Õ Blésq Blom. Reis only sang in one song of each of the two next albums (Tudo Ao Mesmo Tempo Agora and Titanomaquia). The solo efforts did not sell well and Bellotto stated in a 1997 interview that, if any of them experienced a commercial breakthrough, they would hardly go back to the band, which didn't perform well on the radio at that time. Even returning from periods in which they could make their own decisions, the seven members gathered to try and create their eight Titãs album.

By the time of the album's release, Bellotto described it as "a more opened and varied album, with a bigger diversity of musical textures, more happy and relaxed". He also said the album came to prove the band was still alive, since the press allegedly considered the band to be over following so many solo efforts. Reis established comparisons between this album and its predecessor Titanomaquia, which, according to him, "is a shadowier album. The new album is shinier, has more color, is more rhythmically diversified. Like a Sunday after a dark Saturday night". The band also considers its diversity to reflect the musical heterogeneity within the group.

Jack Endino considered Domingo as his favorite Titãs album. About the creation of it, he commented:

It was pre-produced at Nota Por Nota Studios in São Paulo, between April and August 1995; then recorded at Be Bop Sound Studios, also in São Paulo, in September of the same year; mixed at Hanzek Audio, in Seattle in October of the same year and mastered at Starling Sound, in New York City, in the same month.

The album's promotional tour started on 22 December 1995 at the Ginásio do Ibirapuera in São Paulo. In 1996, it was re-released with some bonus tracks, including remixed versions of "Eu Não Vou Dizer Nada (Além do que Estou Dizendo)" and "Tudo o que Você Quiser" and a new song: "Pela Paz", composed as the theme song for the campaign "Caminhada 89 pela Paz" (89 Walk for Peace), by radio 89 FM.

Track listing
Songwriting credits and lead vocal information adapted from the album booklet.

Single

The album's title-track was released as its only single, the band's tenth one, in 1995. The song later appeared as an acoustic version on the Volume Dois album.

Track listing

Personnel
Adapted from the album booklet.

Titãs
 Branco Mello - lead vocals on "Tudo O Que Você Quiser", "Tudo Em Dia", "Ridi Pagliaccio", "Brasileiro" and "Turnê", backing vocals
 Charles Gavin - drums, samplers and rhythmic programming
 Marcelo Fromer - electric guitar, acoustic guitar in "Um Copo de Pinga", "Pela Paz" and "Eu Não Vou Dizer Nada (Além do que Estou Dizendo) Remix Liminha"
 Nando Reis - bass, lead vocals in "O Caroço da Cabeça", backing vocals, acoustic guitar in "O Caroço da Cabeça" and "Um Copo de Pinga"
 Paulo Miklos - lead vocals on "Domingo", "Eu Não Vou Dizer Nada", "Qualquer Negócio" and "Pela Paz", co-lead vocals on "Uns Iguais Aos Outros", backing vocals, keyboards in "O Caroço da Cabeça", sampler programming and editing, saxophone in "Ridi Pagliaccio" and drums in "Um Copo de Pinga"
 Sérgio Britto - lead vocals on "Rock Americano", "Vámonos" and "Um Copo de Pinga", co-lead vocals on "Eu Não Aguento" and "Uns Iguais Aos Outros", backing vocals, keyboards, third electric guitar in "Domingo" and "Um Copo de Pinga"
 Tony Bellotto - electric and acoustic guitar, slide guitar in "Pela Paz", dobro guitar in "Eu Não Vou Dizer Nada (Além do que Estou Dizendo) Remix Liminha"

Guest performances
 Andreas Kisser - third guitar in "Brasileiro"
 Herbert Vianna - lead guitar in "O Caroço da Cabeça"
 Igor Cavalera - second drum kit in "Brasileiro"
 João Barone - second drum kit in "Eu Não Vou Dizer Nada"
 Marcos Suzano - percussion in "Eu Não Aguento", "Turnê" and "Qualquer Negócio"
 Sérgio Boneka - co-lead vocals em "Eu Não Aguento"
 Aureo Galli - samplers in "Rock Americano"
 Liminha - programming, drums, bass, mandolin and acoustic guitar in "Pela Paz"; programming and samplers in "Eu Não Vou Dizer Nada (Além do que Estou Dizendo) Remix Liminha"

Technical staff
 Marco Antonio Cordeiro (Buru) and Edu Vianna - recording technicians
 Paulo Martins - pre-production assistant
 Fátima da Conceição - hostess
 Jack Endino - recording and mixing engineering
 Laura Brantes e Beto Machado - recording and mixing assistants
 Sombra Jones e Mario Amaral - roadies
 Nelson Damascena - executive production
 George Marino e Paulo Junqueiro - mastering
 Sérgio Britto - cover and picture of the swimming pool
 Fábio Afonso - cover and electronic publication
 Vânia Toledo - Titãs picture
 Juliana Toledo - drain picture

References

1995 albums
Titãs albums
Warner Music Group albums
Albums produced by Jack Endino